Dongfeng Race Team was a Chinese sponsored Volvo Ocean 65 yacht. She finished third in the 2014–15 Volvo Ocean Race skippered by Charles Caudrelier and then went on to win the 2017-2018 edition, which started in Alicante, Spain, and ended in The Hague, in the Netherlands.

2017-18 crew 

 Charles Caudrelier (skipper)
 Carolijn Brouwer
 Chen Jinhao (Horace)
 Daryl Wislang
 Fabien Delahaye
 Franck Cammas (navigator in replacement of an injured Pascal Bidégorry on Leg 4)
 Jackson Bouttell
 Jérémie Beyou
 Justine Mettraux
 Kevin Escoffier
 Marie Riou
 Pascal Bidégorry (navigator)
 Stuart Bannatyne
 Xue Liu (Black)

2014-15 crew
Charles Caudrelier (skipper)
Eric Peron
 Horace (Chen Jin Hao)
 Kevin Escoffier
 Martin Strömberg
 Pascal Bidégorry
 Thomas Rouxel
 Wolf (Yang Jiru) 
 Yann Riou (on board reporter)

References

Volvo Ocean Race yachts
Volvo Ocean 65 yachts
Sailing yachts of China
2010s sailing yachts
Sailing yachts designed by Farr Yacht Design